Drew Nelson was a Scottish footballer who played during the 1960s with St Mirren, Worcester City, Ayr United, Dumbarton, East Fife and Clydebank.

References

Scottish footballers
Dumbarton F.C. players
St Mirren F.C. players
Worcester City F.C. players
Ayr United F.C. players
East Fife F.C. players
Clydebank F.C. (1965) players
Scottish Football League players
Living people
Place of birth missing (living people)
Year of birth missing (living people)
Association football inside forwards